These are the Canadian number-one country albums of 1978, per the RPM Country Albums chart.

1978
1978 record charts